South Boston is an unincorporated community in Franklin Township, Washington County, in the U.S. state of Indiana.

History
South Boston was not formally laid out or platted. In the 19th century, a small store was established at South Boston, around which the community grew.

A post office was established at South Boston in 1850, and remained in operation until it was discontinued in 1918.

Geography

References

Unincorporated communities in Washington County, Indiana
Unincorporated communities in Indiana
Louisville metropolitan area